Alexander Berkutov (born May 31, 1986) is a Russian professional ice hockey defenceman who currently plays for HC CSKA Moscow of the Kontinental Hockey League (KHL).

References

External links

1986 births
Living people
Avtomobilist Yekaterinburg players
HC CSKA Moscow players
HC Spartak Moscow players
Molot-Prikamye Perm players
Russian ice hockey defencemen
Sportspeople from Perm, Russia